Feministische Studien (Feminist Studies) is a biannual peer-reviewed academic journal, published since 1982. It features articles written in German and English, covering on women's studies. It is published by the Lucius & Lucius Verlagsgesellschaft and the editors-in-chief are Rita Casale, Claudia Gather, Sabine Hark, Friederike Kuster, Regine Othmer, Tanja Thomas, and Ulla Wischermann.

Abstracting and indexing
The journal is abstracted and indexed in the Social Sciences Citation Index. According to the Journal Citation Reports, the journal has a 2015 impact factor of 0.077, ranking it 40th out of 40 journals in the category "Women's Studies".

Notable people
 Eva Rieger (born 1940), musicologist

See also 
 List of women's studies journals

References

External links 
 

Biannual journals
English-language journals
Feminist journals
German-language journals
Publications established in 1982
Women's studies journals
Multilingual journals